Skunk Lake is a lake in the U.S. state of Wisconsin.

An early variant name was "Valders Lake".

References

Lakes of Wisconsin
Bodies of water of Portage County, Wisconsin